Jesús Glaría Jordán (2 January 1942 – 19 September 1978) was a Spanish footballer. He played for Atlético Madrid and RCD Espanyol. He retired from professional football in 1975 and, three years later, he died in a car accident with his son.

Honours
Atlético Madrid
UEFA Cup Winners' Cup: 1961–62
Spanish League: 1965–66
Spanish Cup: 1960–61, 1964–65

External links
 
 National team data 
 
 RCD Espanyol archives 
 

1942 births
1978 deaths
People from Ribera Arga-Aragón
Spanish footballers
Footballers from Navarre
Association football midfielders
La Liga players
Atlético Madrid footballers
RCD Espanyol footballers
Spain youth international footballers
Spain international footballers
1966 FIFA World Cup players
Road incident deaths in Spain
Catalonia international guest footballers